Gerald Padua Santos (born May 15, 1991) is a Filipino singer and actor. He was the grand champion of Pinoy Pop Superstar (Season 2) on GMA Network in 2006 and dubbed as "The Prince of Ballad". He is THUY in the Miss Saigon UK/International Tour 2017–19 by Cameron Mackintosh Productions logging in 553 performances as Thuy. He is also THUY in the Miss Saigon Denmark (in Danish Language) Production 2023 (Det Ny Teater) solidifying his stature as International Performing Artist. In 2021, he was awarded Stage Performer of the Decade by BroadwayWorld Philippines (2011-2020) for his performances as Pedro Calungsod in San Pedro Calungsod The Musical. For his role as Doc Willie Ong in I WILL: The Musical (2022) he won Best Lead Actor in a Musical in the Aliw Awards 2022. He's also a 2-time "Entertainer Of The Year" in the Prestigious Aliw Awards (2020) (2022). Gerald also has several Film Credits under his belt.

Introduction
Gerald Padua Santos is the grand champion of Pinoy Pop Superstar Season 2 of GMA 7 and is dubbed as the Prince of Ballad. He is Thuy in the 2017–2019 UK/International Tour of Miss Saigon by Cameron Mackintosh.

Early life
He was born Gerald Padua Santos on May 15, 1991 in Navotas, the second of five children. His parents both worked in Navotas Fish Port and were earning just enough to support the family. Singing has been a big part of his family and his immense interest in music was fully supported by his parents. He started singing at the age of 7 years old and started singing in his elementary school (Daanghari Elementary School) in Navotas. He later joined amateur singing contests (around 50 amateur singing contests) and won in many of them (within Metro Manila and nearby provinces like Laguna and Bulacan). He was in Tangos National High School in Navotas when he decided to audition for Pinoy Pop Superstar of GMA-7 at the age of 15.

Career

Singing / Recording
In 2006, Santos became the grand champion of the second season of GMA Network's show Pinoy Pop Superstar. He was the youngest champion of the biggest reality singing contest then hosted by Ms. Regine Velasquez. He sang "Kahit Isang Saglit", "Hanggang" and "Close to Where You Are" as his winning songs in the Final night of PPS Season 2. He is not the typical "biritero" but he is noted for his heartfelt singing and can melt everyone's heart with his simple singing.

After winning the PPS, Santos signed a five-year contract with GMA, including a record deal with GMA Records, and became a regular on the TV series SOP Rules. He was cast for the primetime TV series I Luv New York, and was a co-host of QTV's Popstar Kids in 2006. His SOP role earned him a nomination for a PMPC STAR Awards For TV. He was nominated in the 20th Star Awards for Television in 2006 as Best New Male TV Personality. His first single, "A Day on the Rainbow", was released in November 2006. In 2008 he released his second studio album, Gerald Santos: Pinakahihintay.

In October 2010, a year before his contract with GMA expired, Gerald transferred to TV5. He then released the repackaged edition of "Pinakahihintay" and did a national album mall tour. He won several awards for the studio albums he made. Gerald won in the 3rd Star Awards (October 2011) For Music for the "Pinakahihintay" Repackaged edition Album as Male Pop Artist of the Year. In September 2012, he released his 3rd album, Gerald Santos The Prince of Ballad which garnered 4 nominations in the 5th Star Awards For Music including Male Recording Artist of the Year, Male Pop Artist of the Year and Revival Album of the Year. The album went on to win the Revival Album of the Year in the 5th Star Awards For Music (October 2013).

Gerald's 4th album, Gerald Santos Kahit Among Mangyari was commercially released in July 2015. It is an all-original album the songs of which were written for Gerald by renowned composers.

On May 10, 2017, Santos signed a 2-year contract with Star Music Philippines. He released his first single, I AM YOURS, in June 2017. He has recorded his second single, "Hindi Pa Huli ang Lahat", which has a target release date in August 2017. He is expected to do a full album before his contract expires in 2020.

Concerts
In the concert scene, Santos has done five major solo concerts. Santos been nominated for four consecutive years as Best Male Concert Performer (2011–2014) in the ALIW Awards, winning the coveted award in 2011 for his Major Move concert at the Music Museum. In May 2012, Santos held his Isang Pasasalmat concert at the Peta Phinma Theater which earned for him a second nomination from the ALIW Awards as Best Male Concert Performer.  In 2013, his Prince of Ballad Soaring High concert also got nominated in the 5th Star Awards for Music as Male Concert Performer of the Year, aside from the ALIW Awards.

Gerald Santos It's Time! was held at the SM North EDSA Skydome on June 28, 2014, earning for him another nomination in the ALIW Awards. He also earned a nomination for this concert in the 2015 Star Awards For Music.

On June 13, 2015, his biggest concert (Gerald Santos: Metamorphosis) was held at the historic PICC Plenary Hall. People came in droves and packed the convention center. Gerald is one of the few solo artists who has conquered PICC. For his PICC concert, Gerald was nominated once more in the ALIW Awards 2015 for Best Major Concert – Male. This concert won for him the Best Major Concert – Male in the 28th ALIW Awards, beating the more popular concert artists.

Santos just had a very successful concert at the SM North EDSA Skydome on April 9, 2017 entitled Gerald Santos: Something New in My Life. His special guests were the UP Concert Chorus and for the first time, Ms Regine Velasquez – Alcasid!

Santos had a very successful homecoming concert on May 4, 2019 at The Theatre at Solaire (Gerald Santos: The Homecoming Concert). His Miss Saigon co-stars Aicelle Santos, Joreen Bautista and Leo Valdez joined him on stage. Jake Zyrus also performed with him.

In December 2019, Gerald staged a major concert for the first time at NPAT Resorts World Manila. His guests include Jett Pangarap, Nyoy Volante, Garrett Bolden, Rachel Chan and Kyline Alcantara.

On May 14, 2022, he staged a successful concert in Vienna, Austria ( VHS Paho ) with guests Kathy Aquino, Mark Agpas and Isabel Garcia. He has likewise headlined in successful concerts held in Nottinghill,London im 2017 and 2019.

With his achievements in the concert scene, Gerald is also deserving of the title "Concert Prince".

Musician
As a composer, Santos has composed and written a dozen songs, 4 of which were included in his sophomore album, Gerald Santos Pinakahintay The Repackaged Edition ("Kailan Masasabi", "I Cannot Imagine", "This Feeling Inside", "Gotta Be Strong"). For the "San Pedro Calungsod The Musical", he composed 8 songs. For his 4th album (Gerald Santos Kahit Among Mangyari), he did two compositions ("#MMK" and "Sorry").

Theater
In the theater scene, Santos has done two major productions where he both played the lead roles. his first was in 2011 in Gantimpala Theater Foundation's "Sino Ka Ba Jose Rizal", where he scored an ALIW Award nomination as Best Actor in a Musical. His second musical was Matpil's San Pedro Calungsod: Teen Saint at Seventeen.  The third was Redlife Entertainment Productions Inc.'s "San Pedro Calungsod the Musical". For this particular musical play, Gerald Santos was also the play's composer. In March 2016, he auditioned for the latest production of Miss Saigon by Cameron Mackintosh and was chosen out of the hundreds who auditioned for the role of Thuy in the acclaimed musical. He was part of the Miss Saigon UK/International Tour which ran from July 2017 – March 2019 and covered 5 countries in the UK and Europe. He, thus, joined the list of Filipino talents who have breached the international barrier. Gerald has logged in a total of 553 performances as Thuy and got rave reviews.

In October 2019, Santos played another important role in the Atlantis Theatrical's staging of Sweeney Todd: The Demon Barber of Fleet Street. He played the major role of Anthony Hope with the Broadway Diva herself, Lea Salonga. The musical had a very successful Manila (The Theatre at Solaire) and Singapore  Marina Bay Sands Theatre - November 28- December 8, 2020). For this role, Gerald received warm reception from both the critics and audience alike. This play was under the helm of seasoned director, Bobby Garcia.

Television
Santos was the grand champion of the season 2 of Pinoy Pop Superstar in GMA 7 in June 2006 and it opened the doors of his TV career,

On TV, Santos was part of the long-running SOP. He was also a performer in Party Pilipinas. He was cast in GMA's primetime teleserye "I Luv New York" in 2006 where he played the brother of its lead star, Jolina Magdangal. He also appeared in GMA's top rating programs like "Magpakailanman", "SIS" among others.

From GMA, he transferred to TV5 where he appeared in several shows P.O.5 (2010), Fantastik (2011), Sunday Funday (2012), Hey It's Saberday! (2012). He sang the theme song of Ms. Nora Aunor's TV comeback Sa Ngalan ng Ina in 2011; a song composed by Mr. Ryan Cayabyab.

At present, Santos is a free lancer and is not tied to any of the major networks. He is open though to being a contract artist of a major network if given the opportunity.

Santos has been a consistent interpreter in the most coveted and only song of praise writing competition on national television – A Song of Praise at UNTV channel 37. This program is hosted by Richard Reynoso and Toni Rose Gayda and has been airing for 5 years now. Credits are given to Bro Eli Soriano of "Ang Dating Daan" and Mr. Public Service – Kuya Daniel S. Razon.

Movies
Gerald Santos has finished his first feature film in 2015, Memory Channel, an edgy film which tackles retrograde amnesia and panic/anxiety attack. Gerald stars with Epy Quizon, Bodjie Pascua and Michelle Vito in this movie directed by first-time full-length movie director Rayn Brizuela. This is Gerald's first ever movie which is intended for local and international film festivals.
Gerald has also finished doing the docu-film Emilio Jacinto: Utak ng Katipunan for Legit Entertainment, produced by National Historical Commission and directed by Pat Perez. Gerald was tapped to essay the lead role of Emilio Jacinto. This docu-film will be shown in schools as part of the government's effort to thoroughly educate the youth about our national heroes. To this date, Gerald has played three legendary national figures: Jose Rizal, Emilio Jacinto and Pedro Calungsod.
Gerald's first feature film "Memory Channel" is an official selection in the 2016 World Premieres Film Festival. It competed against 5 other quality Filipino films and was hailed by the festival as an edgy film. Gerald, likewise received favorable reviews for his acting in this movie as an amnesia patient also suffering from anxiety/panic attacks.
His other movie credits include : AL CODA ( with Marion Aunor, 2022 ), MAMASAPANO : Now It Can Be Told ( MMFF 2022 Official Entry, 2md Best Pocture ), ORAS de PELIGRO ( 2023 ).

Awards / Nominations / Recognitions
2006 People's Choice Award (Pinoy Pop Superstar Grand Finals, May 2006) GMA Network

2006 Nominated: New Male TV Personality (SOP; Star Awards for Television)

2011 Nominated: Male Pop Artist of the Year – Pinakahihintay, The Repackaged Edition Album (3rd Star Awards for Music)

2011 Nominated: Best Concert Performance (Male) – Major Move Concert, Music Museum (June 18, 2011, 24th ALIW Awards)

2011 Nominated: Best Actor in a Musical – Sino Ka Ba Jose Rizal (September 2011, 24th ALIW Awards)

2011 Winner: Male Pop Artist of the Year – Pinakahihintay, The Repackaged Edition Album (3rd Star Awards for Music)

2011 Winner: Best Concert Performance (Male) – Major Move Concert, Music Museum (June 18, 2011, 24th ALIW Awards)

2012 Nominated: Best Male Concert Performance (Male) – Isang Pasasalamat, PETA Phinma Theater (May 2012, 25th ALIW Awards)

2013 Nominated: Male Recording Artist of the Year – The Prince of Ballad Album (5th Star Awards for Music)

2013 Nominated: Male Concert Performer of the Year – The Prince of Ballad Soaring High, Music Museum (April 30, 2013, 5th Star Awards for Music)

2013 Nominated: Male Pop Artist of the Year – The Prince of Ballad Album – (5th Star Awards for Music)

2013 Nominated: Revival Album of the Year – The Prince of Ballad Album – (5th Star Awards for Music)

2013 Nominated: Best Concert Performance (Male) – The Prince of Ballad Soaring High, Music Museum (April 30, 2013, 26th ALIW Awards)

2013 Winner: Revival Album of the Year – The Prince of Ballad Album (5th Star Awards for Music)

2014 Nominated: Best Concert Performance (Male) – It's Time! Concert, SM North Edsa Skydome (June 28, 2014, 27th Aliw Awards)

2015 Nominated: Male Concert Performer of the Year – It's Time Concert, SM North Edsa Skydive (June 28, 2014, 7th Star Awards for Music)

2015 Nominated: Male pop Artist of the Year – Kahit Anong Mangyari Album (7th Star Awards for Music)

2015 Winner: Pinakapasadong Dangal ng Kabataan – (April 2015, Gawad Pasado)

2015 Nominated: Best Major Concert – Male (28th ALIW Awards)

2015 Winner: Best Major Concert – Male (28th ALIW Awards)

2017 Nominated: Best Concert Performance (Male) – Something New In My Life, SM North Edsa Skydome (April 9, 2017, 30th ALIW Awards )

2017 Winner: Best Concert Performance (Male) – Something New In My Life, SM North Edsa Skydome (April 9, 2017, 30th Aliw Awards-Dec 2018)

2018 Nominated: Male Concert Performer of the Year -Something New In My Life, SM North Edsa Skydome (April 9, 2017, 9th STAR Awards for Music)

2018 Nominated: Concert of the Year – Something New In My Life, SM North Edsa Skydome (April 9, 2017, 9th STAR Awards for Music)

2019 Nominated: Male Concert Performer of the Year - Gerald Santos: The Homecoming Concert, The Theatre at Solaire (May 4, 2019, 10th Star Awards for Music)

2019 Nominated: Best Major Concert - Male - Gerald Santos: The Homecoming Concert, The Theatre at Solaire (May 4, 2019, 32nd ALIW Awards)

2019: Winner: Best Major Concert - Male - Gerald Santos: The Homecoming Concert, The Theatre at Solaire (May 4, 2019, 32nd ALIW Awards)

2020 - Winner - Best Major Concer - Male - UNLIMITED , NPAT Resorts Wprld Manila, Aliw Awards 2020 

2020 - Winner - Best Online Performer - The Great Shift , Aliw Awards 2020 

2020 - ENTERTAINER of the YEAR - Aliw Awards 2022

2021 -.Winner - Stage Performer of the Decade , San Pedro Caalingsod The Musical, BroadwaWorld Philippines

2022 - Winner - Best Lead Actor ina Musical - I WJLL : The Musical , October 14, 2022 , Metropolitan Theater, Aliw Awards 2022

2022 - ENTERTAINER of the YEAR - Aliw Awards 2022

2023 - Stage Performer of the Year , I WILL : The Musical, October 14, 2022, Meteopolitan Theater, BroadwyWorld philippines

Discography
Studio albums
A Day on the Rainbow (November 2006) – This album contains his official first hit song "Mahal Kita" which became the theme song of the top rating "Marimar" in Channel 7.
Pinakahihintay (November 2008) – It contains his revival of the song "Hanggang", the song which won for him in his very first TV appearance in Pinoy Pop Superstar, scoring a near-perfect 99% from the judges and is literally his ticket to the music industry.
Pinakahihintay The Repackaged Edition (October 2010) – This album won for him the Male Pop Artist of the Year Award from the 3rd PMPC Star Awards and (October 2011) and contains his original compositions.
Gerald Santos The Prince Of Ballad (September 2012) – This album, which won the Revival Album of the Year from the 5th Star Awards for Music was Gerald's first revival album and contains the hit song "Maghintay Ka Lamang" which until now is a source of inspiration among the Filipinos.
Gerald Santos Kahit Anong Mangyari (March 2015) – In this album, Gerald scored a nomination for the 7th Star Awards for Music as Male Pop Artist of the Year (November 2015)
Gerald just signed up with Star Music Philippines in 2017 and released his first single under Star Music entitled "I AM YOURS", composed by Francis "Kiko" Salazar. 
With the advent of online digital releases, Gerald has released numerous songs and include titles such as "Hindi Pa Huli ang Lahat", "Hanggang sa Muli", "Ibulong Mo Na Sa 'Kin", "Sorry", "Wagas", "Di Kaylalangan Pang Mangako", "Ibalik", "Finally" "I Will". His original studio recording of "Hanggang" was also released in 2023.

References

External links
Gerald Santos at iGMA.tv

(https://www.facebook.com/gmapartypilipinas/posts/124414437588040)
(http://www.remate.ph/2011/09/gerald-santos-adding-brilliance-to-his-pinoy-pop-superstar-title/)
(http://www.pep.ph/news/35847/singer-gerald-santos-feels-like-starting-again-with-his-career)
(http://www.pep.ph/news/38538/gerald-santos-overwhelmed-by-nora-aunor39s-presence-during-his-concert)
(http://www.mb.com.ph/pmpc-star-awards-for-music-winners-bared/)
(http://britishtheatre.com/casting-announced-miss-saigon-uk-tour/)
(http://www.philstar.com/entertainment/2017/04/16/1690643/challenge-being-thuy)
(http://entertainment.mb.com.ph/2017/04/21/geralds-long-and-winding-road-to-miss-saigon/)
(http://www.westendtheatre.com/51902/news/casting-announced-for-miss-saigon-uk-tour/attachment/miss-saigon-uk-tour/)

1991 births
Living people
Reality show winners
People from Navotas
Singers from Metro Manila
Male actors from Metro Manila
Filipino male musical theatre actors
Filipino male child actors
Filipino child singers
21st-century Filipino male singers
Filipino pop singers
Participants in Philippine reality television series
GMA Network personalities
GMA Music artists
TV5 (Philippine TV network) personalities
ABS-CBN personalities
Star Music artists